Rafael Sobreira da Costa, nickname is Rafael Paty (born March 15, 1981, in Paty do Alferes) is a Brazilian footballer who plays as a forward for Clube do Remo.

His previous clubs include U.D. Leiria in Portugal, Ituano (SP), Caxias do Sul (RS), Noroeste (SP) and Atlético Ibirama (SC), Lages (SC), América (RJ) and Olaria (RJ). He also played in South Korea for Jeju United.

Rafael Paty signed with Remo in 2014, and after failing to win a place with the first team, he went on loan to Parauapebas for the initial phase of the 2015 Campeonato Paraense. Rafael Paty returned to Remo where he led the club to its 44th Campeonato Paraense title. He scored both goals and was named man of the match as Remo defeated Independente 2–0 in the final.

References

External links
 

1981 births
Living people
Brazilian footballers
Association football forwards
Olaria Atlético Clube players
America Football Club (RJ) players
Esporte Clube Noroeste players
Sociedade Esportiva e Recreativa Caxias do Sul players
Ituano FC players
Tupi Football Club players
U.D. Leiria players
Brazilian expatriate footballers
K League 1 players
Jeju United FC players
Clube do Remo players
Brazilian expatriate sportspeople in South Korea
Expatriate footballers in South Korea